Kevin East (born March 29, 1971) is a retired U.S. soccer goalkeeper who currently coaches the Rutgers–Newark men's soccer team.  He spent six seasons in the USISL and two as a backup keeper with the MetroStars in Major League Soccer.   He is a member of the National Soccer Coaches Association of America National Rating Board and is a former president of the College Soccer Association of New Jersey.

Player

Youth
East graduated from Montgomery High School where he was an all-state soccer player.  He then attended Kean University where he was a member of the men's soccer team from 1989 to 1992.  In 1992, he and his teammates won the NCAA Division III national championship.  He holds the school record for single season and career saves as well as career shutouts.  He graduated with a bachelor's degree in political science and criminal justice in 1993 and was inducted into the Kean University Hall of Fame in 2004.

Professional
In 1994, he signed with the Jersey Dragons in the USISL.  He then played the 1995 season with the Dragons before being drafted by the Columbus Crew in the 3rd round (30th overall) of the 1996 MLS Supplemental Draft.  He broke his wrist during the preseason and was released soon after.  On May 15, 1996, he signed a two-year contract with the Central Jersey Riptide of USISL.  In 1998, he began the season with the New Jersey Stallions before being sent on loan to the MetroStars of Major League Soccer when regular backup Tim Howard joined the U.S. U-20 national team in preparation for the 1999 FIFA World Youth Championship qualification.  He shared time during the 1999 season with the MetroStars and the North Jersey Imperials.  In 2000 and 2001, he played a handful of games for the New Jersey Stallions.

Coach
In 1993, East became an assistant coach at Kean University, a position he held through 1996.  In 1998, he was hired as the men's soccer coach by New Jersey City University.  Over the next nine seasons, he compiled a 123-66-11 record and was the 2005 New Jersey Athletic Conference Coach of the Year.  In 2004, he coached the NJCU women's soccer team for a single season, compiling a 5-13-1 record.  In January 2007, he was hired by Rutgers–Newark as the school's head soccer coach, a position he holds today. East led the men's soccer team to the program's first NJAC championship in 2017.

He is a member of the National Soccer Coaches Association of America National Rating Board.  He is also a former president of the College Soccer Association of New Jersey.

References

External links
Career overview

1971 births
Living people
American soccer coaches
American soccer players
Central Jersey Riptide players
Jersey Dragons players
Montgomery High School (New Jersey) alumni

New York Red Bulls players
New Jersey Stallions players
North Jersey Imperials players
People from Montgomery Township, New Jersey
Soccer players from New Jersey
Sportspeople from Somerset County, New Jersey
Association football goalkeepers
USISL players
USL Second Division players
Columbus Crew draft picks